Gategroup  is a Swiss company providing services to the travel industry, including catering, onboard retail, food service provisioning, and food logistics. It serves as the parent company for four core brands, and is a supplier to many major airlines. Its head office is in Glattbrugg, Switzerland, near Zurich Airport.

History

Beginnings and initial expansion (1992 to 2002) 
Gategroup has its roots in Swissair catering, from which now-subsidiary Gate Gourmet emerged in 1992. Through a series of mergers and acquisitions, Gategroup has grown into a multibillion-dollar operation. Acquisitions include Aero-Chef, SAS Service Partner, VARIG Kitchens, British Airways Kitchens and Iber-Swiss.

The company was worth roughly 6 billion Swiss francs before the September 11 attacks and the bankruptcy of Swissair. The rise of oil prices and collapse in consumer travel damaged airlines and many of Gate Gourmet's main customers went bankrupt or narrowly avoided bankruptcy. The weakness of the airlines affected the industries that cater to or support it. This set the stage for Gate Gourmet requiring a restructuring effort, which soon burdened its employees. The company was then sold in 2002 to Texas Pacific Group for US$870 million.

Acquisitions (2007 to 2016) 

On 1 March 2007, Texas Pacific Group sold its remaining shares in Gate Gourmet to Merrill Lynch.

On September 27, 2007, Gate Gourmet acquired a UK-based group operating under the Fernley and International Aviation Services (IAS) brands. The acquired companies offer services including aircraft cabin cleaning, aircraft washing, de-icing and toilet and water servicing; security activities such as baggage screening and document verification; airport executive lounges; and passenger services such as wheelchair and unaccompanied minor assistance. Along with Fernley and IAS, the group also includes Specialist Airport Services, European Airport Services and Airfield Services Ltd. The companies operate primarily in the UK, including at London's Heathrow, Gatwick, Stansted and Luton airports, as well as Manchester, Dublin, Cork, Shannon, Liverpool, East Midlands, Biggin Hill and Glasgow. European Airport Services also operates in Amsterdam; Brussels, and several other regional airports in France and the Netherlands. The new range of Gate Gourmet's aviation special services were renamed Gate Aviation Services.

In May 2009 Gategroup was listed on the SIX Swiss Exchange under ticker GATE.
 
In 2010 the company acquired Cara Airline Solutions, the catering business from Cara Operations, thus investing in airline catering services in Canada.

In 2012 Gategroup expanded its presence in the Asia Pacific by acquiring Qantas' Q Catering operations in Sydney and Cairns. They later took on the business activities of Pacific Flight Catering in New Zealand.

In February 2016 the acquisition of Swedish travel retail specialist Inflight Service Group (IFS) was completed.

In March 2016 Gategroup acquired 75% of Cambodia Air Catering Services.

On December 2, 2020, Gategroup announced the completion of the acquisition of LSG Group's European business from Deutsche Lufthansa AG. The transaction includes LSG's in-flight catering operations in Germany, Switzerland, the Netherlands, Belgium, Italy and Spain, as well as the global equipment business under the SPIRIANT brand, as well as the European convenience food business under the brand Evertaste, the Ringeltaube brand retail operations, and train catering and lounges.

Developments from 2016 to the present 
In April 2016, Chinese conglomerate HNA Group offered to buy Gategroup for 1.4 billion Swiss francs.  In the beginning of July 2016, HNA Group declared they had bought 63.6 percent of the voting rights and shares in Gategroup. By October 2016, HNA Group had acquired 96.1 percent of the voting rights and applied for a delisting of the remaining shares in Gategroup. They also informed that they were seeking to acquire 98 percent in order to request for the cancellation of the remaining publicly held shares.

In January 2017 Gategroup acquired control of Servair from Air France, adding a major presence in Africa.

Gategroup was delisted from the SIX Swiss Exchange in April 2017.

In February 2018 gategroup co-founded the Airline Catering Association (ACA), which is based in Brussels, Belgium.

In July 2018, Temasek and RRJ Capital joined HNA Group as investors in Gategroup.

In April 2019, RRJ Capital completed the acquisition of all outstanding shares in gategroup from HNA Group. As a result, RRJ Capital became the sole shareholder and Temasek was invested in gategroup through a mandatory exchangeable bond. In September 2019, Temasek converted the mandatory exchangeable bond to acquire 50% stake in gategroup, making Temasek and RRJ co-shareholders.

In December 2019, gategroup reached an agreement for a takeover of the European business of Deutsche Lufthansa AG subsidiary LSG Group, to include LSG's on-board operating business in Germany, Switzerland, the Netherlands, Belgium, Italy and Spain, as well as its global equipment business under the Spiriant brand, its European convenience food business, train catering, lounges and Lufthansa employee markets under the Ringeltaube brand. Gategroup will take on the catering contract with Lufthansa, including the airline's main hubs in Frankfurt and Munich. The deal is expected to close in the first half of 2020.

Company information

Gategroup is a multinational organization with operations on six continents.  As of 2018, it had more than 43,000 employees working across more than 200 facilities in 60 countries. 2018 revenue was approximately 4.9 billion Swiss Francs.

Gategroup has four core brands: deSter, Gate Gourmet, gateretail and Servair.

Disputes and strike action
A major dispute, reminiscent of the Grunwick dispute of the 1970s, ensued when it sacked 670 staff based at Heathrow Airport in August 2005; the staff were gathered in a car park and the announcement made by megaphone. In sympathy with the sacked workers, British Airways staff at the airport walked out, and mass pickets of Gate Gourmet were organised by the Transport and General Workers' Union. The American head of Gate Gourmet at the time, Dave Siegel, blamed the industrial action on "the most irrational, irresponsible group" he had ever seen in organised labour.

Several workers alleged that Gate Gourmet had engineered the dispute to employ non-union workers at lower wages and with worse conditions of employment. The company subsequently offered a redundancy package of more than twice the statutory minimum in an effort to resolve the labour difficulties, secure a new deal with British Airways, and avoid insolvency. The union later negotiated the reinstatement of some of the employees, but others have continued to protest at their treatment.

In a separate 2005 incident, unions representing Gate Gourmet employees in the United States successfully sued the company after it tried to eliminate the employees' healthcare benefits.

Vehicle safety 
In December 2018, a survey by the union of drivers for Gate Gourmet flagged concerns about the catering vehicles used to service planes. 97% of drivers reported that Gate Gourmet is continuing to use vehicles which are labeled "no go" due to issues like broken safety rails, missing emergency equipment or broken brakes. Drivers also reported that the vehicles are infested with rodents or insects.

Food safety

IFSA
Gate Gourmet is an active member of The International Food Services Association's Government Affairs and Education Committee, which issues the World Food Safety Guidelines for Airline Catering (WFSG). IFSA noted in the 2019 WFSG release: "Food safety has long been recognized by the airline catering industry as a matter of paramount importance and this is reflected in its ongoing commitment to the development of industry guidelines."

Global Food Safety Resource
A case study titled "Gate Gourmet Ensures Quality Airline Catering" was published by Global Food Safety Resource, a source for best practices in food safety compliance.

Contaminated carrots incident

In August 2004, 45 people became ill with shigellosis after eating contaminated carrots provided by Gate Gourmet. After the outbreak, the U.S. Food and Drug Administration (FDA) inspected Gate Gourmet's Honolulu facility and determined that there were substantial problems.  Gate Gourmet was warned that unless the problems were rectified, its facility would be shut down.

Needles incident

On July 16, 2012, sewing needles were discovered in four different turkey sandwiches on separate Delta Air Lines flights. Each sandwich was distributed by Gate Gourmet.  The flights originated from Schiphol Airport in Amsterdam, Netherlands, to several different U.S. cities, including Atlanta, Minneapolis, and Seattle. The needles were discovered by passengers, including a U.S. Federal Air Marshal. In response to the incident, Delta advised all of their flights leaving Schiphol Airport to stop serving the sandwiches, and an FBI investigation was launched to determine the cause. One passenger was injured, but declined medical attention.

Listeria scare 
In November 2017, Listeria bacteria were found in Gate Gourmet's production facility in Los Angeles. Airlines including American, Delta and Virgin temporarily suspended their use of Gate Gourmet's services.

FDA inspection 
In December 2017, the FDA inspected one of Gate Gourmet's facilities in Erlanger, Kentucky. The FDA found a number of health infractions, including "too numerous to count cockroaches", including live cockroaches in the ovens used to prepare food, as well as broken and filthy equipment. Pigeons were observed flying over the ovens, as well as eating out of them, and inspectors observed employees cleaning grills with only water and orange juice. In May 2018, the FDA reported that Gate Gourmet had addressed these concerns.

References

External links

Aircraft ground handling companies
Airline catering
Transport companies of Switzerland
Food and drink companies of Switzerland
Foodservice companies
HNA Group
Swissair
Companies based in the canton of Zürich
Food and drink companies established in 1992
Swiss companies established in 1992